Hatfield may refer to:

Places

Settlements

Australia
Hatfield, New South Wales, located in Balranald Shire

England
 Hatfield, East Riding of Yorkshire
 Hatfield, Herefordshire
 Hatfield, Hertfordshire
 Hatfield, South Yorkshire
 Hatfield, Worcestershire
 Hatfield Broad Oak, Essex
 Hatfield Chase, South Yorkshire and North Lincolnshire
 Hatfield Forest, Essex
 Hatfield Peverel, Essex

South Africa
 Hatfield, Pretoria

United States
 Hatfield, Arkansas
 Hatfield, California–Oregon
 Hatfield, Indiana
 Hatfield, Kentucky
 Hatfield, Massachusetts, a New England town
 Hatfield (CDP), Massachusetts, the main village in the town
 Hatfield, Minnesota
 Hatfield, Missouri
 Hatfield, Pennsylvania
 Hatfield, Wisconsin
 Hatfield Township, Montgomery County, Pennsylvania

Zimbabwe
 Hatfield, Harare

Structures
 Hatfield (Gautrain station), Pretoria, South Africa
 Hatfield Aerodrome, Hatfield, Hertfordshire, UK
 Hatfield College, Durham, University of Durham, UK
 Hatfield House (disambiguation), several places
 Hatfield Plantation, a historic plantation and mansion in Brenham, Texas, US
 Hatfield Polytechnic, now the University of Hertfordshire, UK
 HM Prison Hatfield, near Hatfield, South Yorkshire, UK

Other uses 
 Hatfield (surname)
 Hatfield Main F.C., an association football club in Doncaster, UK
 Hatfield Town F.C., an association football club in Hertfordshire, UK
 USS Hatfield (DD-231), a U.S. Navy ship
 "Hatfield", a 2003 song by Byzantine from The Fundamental Component

See also